Mongolia competed in the Winter Olympic Games for the first time at the 1964 Winter Olympics in Innsbruck, Austria.

A group of cross-country skiers from Mongolia traveled to the Olympics, unaware of any application process. They were allowed to compete.

Biathlon

Men

 1 Two minutes added per miss.

Cross-country skiing

Men

Women

Speed skating

Men

Women

References
Official Olympic Reports
 Olympic Winter Games 1964, full results by sports-reference.com

Nations at the 1964 Winter Olympics
1964 Winter Olympics
Oly